Atomic War Bride is a 1960 Yugoslav science-fiction and drama film directed by Veljko Bulajić.

The film won three Golden Arena awards at the 1960 Pula Film Festival, including for Best Director (Veljko Bulajić), Best Actor (Antun Vrdoljak) and Best Scenography (Duško Jeričević), and was nominated for the Golden Lion award at the 1960 Venice Film Festival.

Plot
At a church in the country, eternally optimistic John marries Maria, unaware that a nuclear war is about to begin, and she becomes his Atomic War Bride.

References

External links

Atomic War Bride at hrfilm.hr 

1960 films
1960s science fiction drama films
Croatian black-and-white films
Films about nuclear war and weapons
Films directed by Veljko Bulajić
Films shot in Croatia
Jadran Film films
Serbo-Croatian-language films
Films with screenplays by Cesare Zavattini
Yugoslav science fiction drama films
Croatian science fiction drama films
Films set in Yugoslavia